a passenger railway station in the city of Katori, Chiba Japan, operated by the East Japan Railway Company (JR East).

Lines
Suigō Station is served by the Narita Line, and is located 47.5 kilometers from the terminus of line at Sakura Station.

Layout
The station consists of dual opposed side platforms connected by a footbridge to a wooden, single-story station building. The station is unattended.

Platforms

History
Suigō Station was opened on November 10, 1931, as a station on the Japanese Government Railways (JGR) for both freight and passenger operations. After World War II, the JGR became the Japanese National Railways (JNR). Scheduled freight operations were suspended from October 1, 1962. The station has been unattended since July 1, 1970. The station was absorbed into the JR East network upon the privatization of the Japanese National Railways (JNR) on April 1, 1987. A new station building was completed in June 2009.

Passenger statistics
In fiscal 2006, the station was used by an average of 185 passengers daily.

Surrounding area
 Kanto Driving School

See also
 List of railway stations in Japan

References

External links

JR East station information 

Railway stations in Japan opened in 1931
Railway stations in Chiba Prefecture
Narita Line
Katori, Chiba